The AN/CPS-6 was a medium-range search/height finder Radar used by the United States Air Force Air Defense Command.

The AN/CPS-6 was developed during the later stages of World War II by the Radiation Laboratory at MIT. The first units were produced in mid-1945. 

General Electric developed and produced the A-model and subsequent B-model at a plant in Syracuse, New York. The unit consisted of two antennas. One of the antennas slanted at a forty-five degree angle to provide the height-finder capability. 

Initially, the radar was designed to detect fighter aircraft at 100 miles and 16,000 feet. The radar used five transmitters that operated at S-band frequencies ranging from 2700 to 3019 MHz. It took twenty-five people to operate the radar. 

An AN/CPS-6 radar was installed as part of the Lashup Radar Network at Twin Lights, New Jersey, in 1949 and proved capable of detecting targets at ranges of eighty-four miles. The first units of the follow-on 6B radar set were ready for installation by mid-1950. Fourteen 6B units were used within the first permanent network. 

A component designed to improve the radar's range was added in 1954. Initial tests showed the 6B unit had a range of 165 miles with an altitude limit of 45,000 feet. One radar unit and its ancillary electronic equipment had to be transported in eighty-five freight cars. The Air Force phased out the 6B model between mid-1957 and mid-1959.

The AN/FPS-10 unit was essentially a stripped-down version of the AN/CPS-6B. Thirteen of these units served within the first permanent network.

References

 AN/CPS-6 @ radomes.org
 Winkler, David F. (1997), Searching the skies: the legacy of the United States Cold War defense radar program. Prepared for United States Air Force Headquarters Air Combat Command.

Ground radars
Radars of the United States Air Force
General Electric radars
Military equipment introduced from 1945 to 1949